AMF Bowling 2004 is a bowling video game released exclusively for the Xbox in the US on December 1, 2003. Titled "PBA Bowling 2004" in its early development stages, the game was also slated for a PlayStation 2 release. The game has similar graphics and gameplay to Bethesda Softworks' previous PBA Bowling 2001 and its predecessor PBA Bowling 2 for the PC.

Reception

AMF Bowling 2004 received mediocre to poor reviews from critics. GameRankings and Metacritic both gave it a score of 48% and 48 out of 100 respectively. Hilary Goldstein, writing for IGN, called it "a budget title with no frills, weak animations, terrible character models, and a lack of visual pop." Russ Garbutt of Xbox Nation magazine said that the game's physics and sound effects are realistic, but complained about "the pseudo-honky-tonk music, which makes players feel as if they're in the middle of a hillbilly bar or, alternately, the eighth circle of hell" and called the visuals "yawn inspiring".

References

External links
 

2003 video games
Bowling video games
Xbox games
North America-exclusive video games
Xbox-only games
Video games developed in the United States
Mud Duck Productions games
Multiplayer and single-player video games
Crave Entertainment games